Aspidotis carlotta-halliae is a species of perennial fern known by the common names tufted lacefern and Carlotta Hall's lace fern. It is endemic to California, where it is found in the Central Coast Ranges and coastal hillsides, often on serpentine soils. This species is a fertile hybrid between Aspidotis californica and Aspidotis densa. The fern was named for fern collector Carlotta Case Hall, who coauthored the 1912 botanical guide A Yosemite Flora with her husband, botanist Harvey Monroe Hall.

Description
In appearance it is intermediate between the two other ferns. It has leathery triangular leaves divided into many pairs of leaflets, which are each subdivided into many coarse, irregularly toothed segments. The stipe is very thin and dark. The undersides of the segments are lined with sori containing sporangia. It is often found growing under rocks.

References

External links
Jepson Manual Treatment
USDA Plants Profile
Flora of North America
Photo gallery

Pteridaceae
Ferns of California
Endemic flora of California
Natural history of the California chaparral and woodlands
Natural history of the California Coast Ranges
Plants described in 1957